The Mont Tout Blanc is a 3,438.2 metres high mountain belonging to the Italian side of Graian Alps.

Toponymy 
Tout Blanc in French means totally white, all-white. The mountain is also known as Mont Taou Blanc or Mont Teu Blanc.

Geography 
The Mont Tout Blanc is located on the ridge dividing the Valsavarenche valley (East of the mountain) from the Rhêmes valley (West), both on the right-hand side of the Aosta Valley. The Aouillé pass (Col de l'Aouillé) divides it from the neighbouring Pointe de l'Aouillé (3,445 m) while the Col Rosset divides the Taou Blanc from Punta Leynir.

SOIUSA classification 
According to SOIUSA (International Standardized Mountain Subdivision of the Alps) the mountain can be classified in the following way:
 main part = Western Alps
 major sector = North Western Alps
 section = Graian Alps
 subsection = Central Graian Alps
 supergroup = Catena Grande Sassière-Tsanteleina
 group = Costiera Galisia-Entrelor-Bioula
 code = I/B-7.III-A.1

Access to the summit 
The mountain can be accessed from Nivolet Pass (2.641 m); this route requires a good hiking experience, although is sometimes considered an  alpinistic route of F+ level. The top of the Taou Balnc offers a good point of view on Gran Paradiso massif.

Mountain huts 
 Refuge città di Chivasso (2,604 m).

Nature protection 
The Mont Tout Blanc belongs to the Parco Nazionale del Gran Paradiso.

Maps
 Istituto Geografico Militare (IGM) official maps of Italy, 1:25.000 and 1:100.000 scale, on-line version
 Carta dei sentieri e dei rifugi scala 1:50.000 n. 3 Il Parco Nazionale del Gran Paradiso, Istituto Geografico Centrale - Torino

External links

References

Tout Blanc
Tout Blanc
Mountains of the Graian Alps